Juratyrant (meaning "Jurassic tyrant") is a tyrannosauroid dinosaur genus from the late Jurassic period (early Tithonian age) of England. The genus contains a single species, Juratyrant langhami, which was once classed as a species of Stokesosaurus.

Discovery
 
The species is known from a single specimen consisting of an "associated partial skeleton represented by a complete pelvis" as well as a partially complete leg and neck, back and tail vertebrae. This skeleton was discovered in 1984 in Dorset. The specimen was mentioned in several papers, but was not formally described until 2008. The species was named in honor of commercial fossil collector Peter Langham, who uncovered the specimen. The specimen was discovered in strata of the Kimmeridge Clay dating from the Tithonian, the final stage of the Late Jurassic, and belonging to the Pectinatites pectinatus ammonite zone, indicating the fossil is between 149.3 and 149 million years old.

Description 
Paul (2010) listed it at 5 meters (16 ft) and 300 kg (660 lbs). Another estimation gave a larger size of 6.7 meters (22 ft) and 760 kg (1,675 lbs). 

The holotype of Juratyrant is a partial skeleton composed of specimens OUMNH J.3311-1 through OUMNH J.3311-30. Its components include a cervical vertebra, five dorsal vertebrae, a complete sacrum, five caudal vertebrae, a complete pelvic girdle, both femurs, both tibiae, and various other fragments. Although initially considered a species of Stokesosaurus due to various traits of the ilium, subsequent review has shown that due to the limited amount of pelvic material for basal tyrannosauroids, these traits cannot be assumed to only be present in these two species and thus S. langhami must be placed in its own genera. Once separated from Stokesosaurus, Juratyrant can be characterized by four autapomorphies, as well as two assumed autapomorphies (which are difficult to assess due to preservation):

 An ischial apron with a "folded" appearance.
 A fibular flange that continues as a distinct low ridge to the proximal end of the tibia.
 A convex tubercule on the ischium.
 A deep lateral fossa on the pubis below the acetabulum.
 A thin but prominent hyposphene on the fifth sacral vertebra (assumed).
 A broad, concave extensor groove of the femur (assumed).

Classification

The species was originally assigned to the genus Stokesosaurus, as Stokesosaurus langhami, by Roger Benson in 2008. However, later studies showed that it was not necessarily a close relative of Stokesosaurus clevelandi, the type species of that genus. It was formally re-classified in its own genus, Juratyrant, by Benson and Stephen Brusatte in 2013 and placed as a sister taxon to Stokesosaurus clevelandi in a clade (also including Eotyrannus) of basal tyrannosauroids more advanced than Dilong. 

However, in 2013 Loewen et al. published a cladogram placing Juratyrant as a sister taxon to Stokesosaurus inside Proceratosauridae due to sharing with Sinotyrannus a narrow preacetabular notch. Many basal tyrannosauroids have incomplete or unknown ilia and this trait may be more widespread than currently known.  This cladogram is shown below.

However, a 2016 analysis by Brusatte and Carr utilizing both parsimonious and Bayesian phylogeny placed Stokesosaurus and Juratyrant as tyrannosauroids slightly more advanced than the Proceratosauridae and Dilong. In addition, Eotyrannus is recovered as a sister taxon of these genera in the parsimonious phylogeny. The find of this animal in Europe puts in question to the purported Asian origin for these animals along with North American Stokesosaurus and European Aviatyrannis arguing for a more complex biogeography for tyrannosauroids.

See also 
 Timeline of tyrannosaur research

References 

Tyrannosaurs
Tithonian life
Late Jurassic dinosaurs of Europe
Jurassic England
Fossils of England
Fossil taxa described in 2013
Taxa named by Stephen L. Brusatte